Horton Kirby  is a village in the Sevenoaks District of Kent, England. It is located 3.9 miles east of Swanley & 4.9 miles south of Dartford. Together with the nearby village of South Darenth, it forms the Horton Kirby and South Darenth civil parish.

Heritage
Horton Kirby Environmental Studies Centre provides nature and country life-related outdoor activities for schoolchildren from South London.

Remains of a Roman villa were discovered in 1972 on the Westminster Field recreation ground, just across the Darent from the village. The discovery was made when new main sewage drains were being dug. The extra costs of diverting these to save the villa were met by public subscription, with fund-raising help from local schoolchildren. The remains include those of a Roman granary at least 100 ft in length and 60 ft wide. The site was back-filled after preservation work was completed.

Transport
The A225 road between Dartford and Sevenoaks passes to the west of Horton Kirby, on the opposite side of the River Darent. The M20 and M25 motorways can both be accessed via the Swanley Interchange, approximately 3.5 miles from Horton Kirby.

The village is served by the Arriva Kent Thameside route 414 which provides hourly connections to South Darenth, Sutton-at-Hone, Hawley and Dartford.

See also
Franks Hall

References

External links

A history of the mills can be found here

Villages in Kent
Roman villas in Kent
Nature centres in England